Kamyakarma refers to those karmas (deeds) in Hinduism that are prudential in nature, motivated by the desire for a given outcome. Unlike the nitya karmas, the Shastras do not require daily or regular observance of these rituals. They are generally performed for the sake of their intended results. A few kamyakarmas are listed below:
Putrakameshti
Agnistoma
Agnicayana

See also
Nitya karma
Shrauta

Yajna

References 
Hindu philosophical concepts